Turbo mazatlanicus is a species of sea snail, marine gastropod mollusk in the family Turbinidae.

 Taxonomic status: Some authors place the name in the subgenus Turbo (Chaenoturbo).

Description
The length of the shell varies between 5 mm and 15 mm.

Distribution
This species occurs in the Pacific Ocean off Mazatlán, Mexico.

References

 Alf A. & Kreipl K. (2003). A Conchological Iconography: The Family Turbinidae, Subfamily Turbininae, Genus Turbo. Conchbooks, Hackenheim Germany.
 Williams, S.T. (2007). Origins and diversification of Indo-West Pacific marine fauna: evolutionary history and biogeography of turban shells (Gastropoda, Turbinidae). Biological Journal of the Linnean Society, 2007, 92, 573–592.

External links
 

mazatlanicus
Gastropods described in 1932